Marco Castaneda (born June 15, 1950, in Bogotá, Colombia) is a former jockey who competed in Thoroughbred racing in his native Colombia before emigrating to the United States in 1971 where he became one of the top riders of his era and winner of the 1983 George Woolf Memorial Jockey Award. 

From a family of five jockeys, his younger brother Kelly also met with success riding in the United States.

In 1987, Marco Castaneda was voted the Jack Robinson Memorial Award given annually by the Northern California Turf Writers Association at Bay Meadows Racetrack in San Mateo, California in honor of the widely respected Bay area jockey who died in a racing accident on June 20, 1973, while trying to save a fellow jockey.

Retired, Castaneda did not ride in 1995 or 1996 then came back in 1997 but made only 16 starts before retiring permanently having won 3,163 races in the United States and Canada.

References

1950 births
Living people
Colombian jockeys
American jockeys
Sportspeople from Bogotá
Colombian expatriate sportspeople in the United States